Alone and Unarmed is a Soviet 1984 crime drama directed  by Pavel Fattahutdinov  and Vladimir Khotinenko. A screen adaptation of the detective Nikolai Leonov's  Agony.

Plot 
The film is set in 1927. Former commander of the Red Army Konstantin Vorontsov is appointed chief of criminal investigation in a small provincial town. Together with experienced investigation employee Ivan Melentyev, he starts to fight the leader of the thieves' world who goes by the name of Korney. Vorontsov and Melentyev prefer different methods of work; if Melentyev relies on deliberate placement of his people in the criminal environment, then Vorontsov wants to act as quickly as possible. The complexity of the struggle against Korney is that he does not commit the crimes with his own hands but instead oversees their execution. Due to a successful operation judiciary police manages to plant their agent to Korney in order to find out the place and time of the upcoming thief gathering. But at the last moment he changes the gathering place. Vorontsov has no time to warn anyone and is forced to act alone. He cleverly plays on the diverging interests in the company of thieves and destroys their sense of community. Korney kills Vorontsov but then gets arrested.

Cast
Vasily Mishchenko as Konstantin Nikolaevich Vorontsov
 Ivan Agafonov as Korney
 Vsevolod Larionov as Ivan Ivanovich Melentyev
 Viktor Bortsov as Dmitry Sergeyevich
 Boris Galkin as Sonny
 Adolf Ilyin as Alexey
 Mikhail Kononov as Pyotr, porter
Avangard Leontyev as photographer
 Elena Mayorova as Darya Ivanovna  Latysheva
 Talgat Nigmatulin as  Khan  (Hassan Halidov)
 Nikolay Smorchkov as Treshchalov

Production 
Vladimir Khotinenko's film was shot in Perm and Kungur.

References

External links

Films directed by Vladimir Khotinenko
1984 directorial debut films
Soviet crime drama films
1984 crime drama films
1984 films